Repedea may refer to several places in Romania:

Repedea, a commune and a village in Maramureș County
Repedea, a village in the commune Străoane, Vrancea County
Repedea, one of the Seven hills of Iași
the Repedea Hill Fossil Site near Iași
Repedea (Ruscova), a river in Maramureș County
Repedea (Vișeu), a river in Maramureș County
Repedea (Latorița), a river in Vâlcea County